Kanduah Mahakali High School is a primary and secondary school located in Kanduah, Howrah district, West Bengal, India. The school is coeducational, serving about 1,070 students.

See also
Education in India
List of schools in India
Education in West Bengal

References

External links

Primary schools in West Bengal
High schools and secondary schools in West Bengal
Schools in Howrah district
Educational institutions established in 1958
1958 establishments in West Bengal